Associação Desportiva Socorrense, commonly known as Socorrense, is a Brazilian football club based in Nossa Senhora do Socorro, Sergipe state.

History
The club was founded on August 31, 2005. Socorrense won the Campeonato Sergipano Série A2 in 2010.

Achievements

 Campeonato Sergipano Série A2:
 Winners (1): 2010

Stadium
Associação Desportiva Socorrense play their home games at Estádio Vanúzia Franco. The stadium has a maximum capacity of 3,000 people.

References

Association football clubs established in 2005
Football clubs in Sergipe
2005 establishments in Brazil